Swami Niranjanananda Saraswati (born 14 February 1960) is the successor of Satyananda Saraswati, founder of Satyananda Yoga, who passed on the worldwide coordination of Satyananda Yoga to Niranjanananda in 1988.

He is Born Kayastha family in Rajnandgaon, Chhattisgarh, India, Niranjanananda is considered by his followers to be a yogi from birth. He was named 'Niranjan' (the Untainted One) by his guru Satyananda. He began his training at Bihar School of Yoga in India at the age of four through the use of yoga-nidra and practice of other yoga techniques. At the age of ten, he was initiated as a sannyasi and thereafter for eleven years he lived overseas. From 1971, he extensively toured Europe and North and South America. This experience gave him an understanding of the Western mind and society. In 1983 he returned to India and was appointed the Head of Bihar School of Yoga. For the next eleven years, he spearheaded the research and development activities at Ganga Darshan, Shivananda Math and the Yoga Research Foundation.

In 1990, he was initiated in the tradition of Paramahamsa and in 1993 he was chosen as the spiritual successor of Satyananda. In 1993, he organised a World Yoga Convention on the occasion of the golden jubilee of the sannyasa of his guru. In 1994, he established Bihar Yoga Bharati as the centre for higher studies in the field of yoga. He founded Yoga Publication Trust in 2000.

In 2009, following the mandate of his Guru, Swami Satyananda Saraswati, he relinquished and renounced all administrative responsibilities and institutional posts. Swami Niranjanananda now lives as an independent sannyasin, following the lifestyle and sadhanas of a paramahansa sannyasin. From 2013, following in the tradition of his Guru, Swami Niranjanananda is performing the arduous panchagni tapasya or austerity, and other sadhanas and yajnas as elucidated in the Kathopanishad, Brihadaranyaka and Chhandogya Upanishads.

He was given the third-highest civilian award of the country, Padma Bhushan, in 2017 for distinguished service of high order in the category/field of prominence of Others(Yoga).

Publications

Bihar School of Yoga has published several books by Swami Niranjananda. These include:
 Jnana Yoga
 My Inheritance of Sannyasa
 The Yoga of Sage Vasishtha
 The Yoga of Sri Krishna
 Yoga in Daily Life
 Dharma of a Disciple
 Head, Heart & Hands
 Karma & Karma Yoga
 Mantra & Yantra
 Mind, Mind Management & Raja Yoga
 Origin of Yoga & Pashupata Yoga
 The Paths of Pravritti & Nivritti
 Sannyasa
 On the Wings of the Swan (four volumes)
 Yoga Sadhana Panorama (five volumes)
 Prana Pranayama
 Yoga Chudamani Upanishad
 Gheranda Samhita
 Dharana Darshan
 Sannyasa Darshan
 Yoga Darshan

References

External links
 http://www.yogapoint.com/info/swamiji2.htm
 https://www.youtube.com/watch?v=amPz09I401Q

Indian yoga teachers
20th-century Hindu religious leaders
21st-century Hindu religious leaders
1960 births
Living people
Recipients of the Padma Bhushan in other fields